Butler County is a county located in the southwestern part of the U.S. state of Ohio. As of the 2020 census, the population was 390,357. Its county seat and largest city is Hamilton. It is named for General Richard Butler, who died in 1791 during St. Clair's Defeat. Located along the Great Miami River, it is also home to Miami University, a public university founded in 1809.
Butler County is part of the Cincinnati, OH-KY-IN Metropolitan Statistical Area. The majority of the county is in District 52 of the State House.

History
Successive cultures of ancient Indigenous peoples of the Americas occupied areas of the county. They built large earthworks, seven of which were still standing and recorded by a Smithsonian survey.

Early French explorers likely passed through the area along the Miami River. The gravesites of David and Margaret Gregory indicate they were some of the first white settlers in the area in Liberty Township. White settlers began moving into the area in larger numbers after the 1793 Treaty of Greenville was signed with the Native Americans of the area.

Butler County was formed on March 24, 1803, from portions of Hamilton County. It is named for General Richard Butler. Between 1803 and 1823, the townships of the county became officially recognized. Large portions of the county were held by non-resident owners, including 640 acres owned by future President William H Harrison. Some land that was originally part of Butler County was reassigned to Warren County in the north and Hamilton County to the south. Butler County's original size was 480 sq miles.

In 1830, Peter Schrock emigrated from France to live in Butler County.

Around the late 1860s or early 1870s, the community of Mauds was the sight of an attempt by a local entrepreneur to construct a mill that worked via perpetual motion. A large crowd gathered to watch the mill start, and when it did not, laughter ensued. Nothing was heard from the unnamed entrepreneur again, and the mill quickly vanished. The local newspapers did not record the event, and the only record of its occurrence was transmitted by elderly residents of Mauds to one William Marion Miller of Miami University.

The Great Flood of 1913 affected much of the county, particularly the communities of Middletown, Ohio where approximately 25% of the town was flooded and 6 people died and Hamilton, Ohio, where 46% of the city was flooded, over 300 buildings destroyed, and at least 98 people killed.

In the 1920s, Butler, Pickaway and Washington counties were central areas of the rural membership of the Ku Klux Klan in Ohio.

In 1957 the Ohio Legislature established Hueston Woods State Park, which covers 3,596 acres in Butler and neighboring Preble County. In addition to a 625-acre manmade lake, the park contains the 200-acre Hueston Woods, one of the last near-virgin growths of American beech and maple in Ohio.

Geography and geology

The majority of Butler County consists of the river valleys of the Great and Little Miami Rivers. The valley was originally carved by glaciation.  

The soil at highest uplands is frequently heavy in clay, moving downhill to a sandy loam, while in the valleys the soil is black with river deposits.
  
Before deforestation by settlers, much of the area was forests of American beech and maple trees.

Adjacent counties
Preble County (north)
Montgomery County (northeast)
Warren County (east)
Hamilton County (south)
Dearborn County, Indiana (southwest)
Franklin County, Indiana (west)
Union County, Indiana (northwest)

Demographics

2000 census
As of the census of 2000, there were 332,807 people, 123,082 households, and 87,880 families residing in the county. The racial makeup of the county was 91.20% White, 5.27% Black or African American, 0.21% Native American, 1.55% Asian, 0.03% Pacific Islander, 0.62% from other races, and 1.13% from two or more races. 1.43% of the population were Hispanic or Latino of any race. 28.1% were of German, 16.7% American, 10.7% Irish, and 9.8% English ancestry according to Census 2000. Those citing "American" ancestry in Butler County are of overwhelmingly English extraction, most English Americans identify simply as American because their ancestors have been in North America for centuriesin some cases since the 1600s.

There were 123,082 households, out of which 35.50% had children under the age of 18 living with them, 57.00% were married couples living together, 10.70% had a female householder with no husband present, and 28.60% were non-families. 22.70% of all households were made up of individuals, and 7.60% had someone living alone who was 65 years of age or older. The average household size was 2.61 and the average family size was 3.07.

In the county, the population was spread out, with 25.90% under the age of 18, 11.90% from 18 to 24, 29.80% from 25 to 44, 21.70% from 45 to 64, and 10.70% who were 65 years of age or older. The median age was 34 years. For every 100 females there were 95.30 males. For every 100 females age 18 and over, there were 92.20 males.

The median income for a household in the county was $47,885, and the median income for a family was $57,513. Males had a median income of $42,052 versus $27,602 for females. The per capita income for the county was $22,076. About 5.40% of families and 8.70% of the population were below the poverty line, including 9.10% of those under age 18 and 7.00% of those age 65 or over.

2010 census
As of the census of 2010, there were 368,130 people, 135,960 households, and 95,404 families residing in the county. The racial makeup of the county was 86.0% white, 7.3% black or African American, 2.4% Asian, 0.2% American Indian, 0.1% Pacific islander, 1.8% from other races, and 2.1% from two or more races. Those of Hispanic or Latino origin made up 4.0% of the population. In terms of ancestry, 27.0% were German, 14.8% were American, 13.6% were Irish, and 9.7% were English.

Of the 135,960 households, 35.9% had children under the age of 18 living with them, 52.9% were married couples living together, 12.4% had a female householder with no husband present, 29.8% were non-families, and 23.5% of all households were made up of individuals. The average household size was 2.63 and the average family size was 3.10. The median age was 36.0 years.

The median income for a household in the county was $54,788 and the median income for a family was $68,539. Males had a median income of $50,499 versus $37,094 for females. The per capita income for the county was $25,892. About 8.3% of families and 12.8% of the population were below the poverty line, including 16.1% of those under age 18 and 6.8% of those age 65 or over.

Politics
Prior to 1952, Butler County was strongly Democratic in presidential elections, only backing two Republican candidates for president from 1856 to 1948. Starting with the 1952 election, it has become a Republican Party  stronghold, with the sole Democrat to win the county in a presidential election since then being Lyndon B. Johnson in 1964 in the midst of his statewide and national landslide victory.

|}

Education
There are sixteen school districts having territory in Butler County.

Primary Boundaries in Butler County
Edgewood City School District (also in Preble)
Edgewood High School, Trenton (The Cougars) 
Fairfield City School District
Fairfield High School, Fairfield (The Indians)
Hamilton City School District
Hamilton High School, Hamilton (Big Blue)
Lakota Local School District
Lakota East High School, Liberty Township (The Thunderhawks)
Lakota West High School, West Chester (The Firebirds)
Madison Local School District
Madison High School, Middletown (The Mohawks)
Middletown City School District (also in Warren)
Middletown High School, Middletown (The Middies)
Monroe Local School District (also in Warren)
Monroe High School, Monroe (The Hornets)
New Miami Local School District
New Miami High School, New Miami (The Vikings)
Ross Local School District
Ross High School, Hamilton (The Rams)
Talawanda City School District (also in Preble)
Talawanda High School, Oxford (The Braves)

Partial Boundaries in Butler County
Mason City School District, Mason OH (Primarily in Warren County)
Northwest Local School District, Cincinnati OH (Primarily in Hamilton County)
Preble Shawnee School District, Camden OH (Primarily in Preble County)
Princeton City School District, Springdale OH (Primarily in Hamilton County)
Southwest Local School District, Harrison OH (Primarily in Hamilton County)
Union County–College Corner Joint School District, Liberty IN (Partial in Preble County, Ohio, Primarily in Union and Franklin Counties in Indiana)

Private High Schools
Father Stephen T. Badin High School, (Known as Badin High School), Hamilton (The Rams)
Cincinnati Christian Schools, Fairfield (The Cougars)
Middletown Christian Schools, Middletown (The Eagles) (School complex located in Warren County)

Higher Education
Butler County is home to top ranked and 10th oldest public university, Miami University.

Campuses
Miami University Main Campus, located in Oxford, OH. Founded in 1809.
 Miami University Middletown, located in Middletown. Founded in 1966, this is Ohio's first regional campus.
 Miami University Hamilton, located in Hamilton. Founded in 1968. 
 Miami University Voice of America Learning Center, located in West Chester. Founded in 2009, this campus houses the Farmer School of Business MBA program.

Butler County is also home to Butler Tech, a Career Technical Education institution for High School students and Adults. Butler Tech has campuses in West Chester and Fairfield Township.

Communities

Cities

Fairfield
Hamilton (county seat)
Middletown
Monroe
Oxford
Sharonville
Trenton

Villages
College Corner
Jacksonburg
Millville
New Miami
Seven Mile

Census-designated places

Beckett Ridge
Darrtown
Four Bridges
Olde West Chester
Ross
Somerville
Wetherington
Williamsdale

Unincorporated communities

Alert
Bethany
Blue Ball
Collinsville
Excello
Indian Springs
Maud
McGonigle
Miltonville
Okeana
Oneida
Overpeck
Pisgah
Poasttown
Port Union
Scipio
Shandon
Tylersville
West Middletown
Woodsdale

Townships
There are thirteen civil townships in Butler County and three paper townships:

Civil

Fairfield
Hanover
Lemon
Liberty
Madison
Milford
Morgan
Oxford
Reily
Ross
St. Clair
Wayne
West Chester (formerly Union Township)

Paper
Hamilton
Heritage (Fairfield)
Middletown

Ohio House Districts
Ohio House of Representatives, 51st District
Ohio House of Representatives, 52nd District
Ohio House of Representatives, 53rd District
Ohio House of Representatives, 54th District

Ohio Senate Districts
Ohio Senate, 4th District
Ohio Senate, 7th District

Notable people 

Walter Alston, manager of Brooklyn/Los Angeles Dodgers
John Boehner, congressman, Speaker of the House
Mary Bowermaster, masters athletics record holder
James E. Campbell, governor of Ohio
Cris Carter, football player
Frank Clair, football player
Ray Combs, television personality
Chase Crawford, actor and film producer
Greg Dulli, musician
Weeb Ewbank, football coach
Andrew L. Harris, governor of Ohio
Donald Harvey, serial killer
William Dean Howells, writer
Lorenzo D. Immell, Medal of Honor recipient in the American Civil War
Howard Jones, football coach
Kenesaw Mountain Landis, federal judge and baseball commissioner
Mark Lewis, baseball player
Jerry Lucas, basketball player
McGuire Sisters, musical group
Ezra Meeker, Oregon Trail preservationist
Joe Nuxhall, baseball player and radio announcer, both for the Cincinnati Reds
Darrell Pace, Olympic archer
Clarence Page, columnist
Nan Phelps, artist
Charles Francis Richter, scientist devising the Richter scale for earthquakes
Glen Rogers, serial killer
Charlie Root, baseball player
Bonnie Rotten, award-winning pornographic actress
Brady Seals, musician
Kent Tekulve, baseball player
Roger Troutman, musician
C. William Verity, politician and businessman
Scott Walker, musician
Simon Stepaniak, NFL player for the Green Bay Packers.

See also
National Register of Historic Places listings in Butler County, Ohio

References

Further reading
Bert S. Barlow, W.H. Todhunter, Stephen D. Cone, Joseph J. Pater, and Frederick Schneider, eds. Centennial History of Butler County, Ohio. Hamilton, Ohio: B.F. Bowen, 1905.
Jim Blount. The 1900s: 100 Years In the History of Butler County, Ohio. Hamilton, Ohio: Past Present Press, 2000.
Butler County Engineer's Office. Butler County Official Transportation Map, 2003. Fairfield Township, Butler County, Ohio: The Office, 2003.
A History and Biographical Cyclopaedia of Butler County, Ohio with Illustrations and Sketches of Its Representative Men and Pioneers. Cincinnati, Ohio: Western Biographical Publishing Company, 1882.
Ohio. Secretary of State. The Ohio municipal and township roster, 2002–2003. Columbus, Ohio: The Secretary, 2003.

External links
County website

 
1803 establishments in Ohio
Populated places established in 1803